Phyllanthus calycinus, known as false boronia and snowdrop spurge, is a small shrub in the family Phyllanthaceae, which grows to heights from 20 cm to 1.2 m, often on sandy soils. It is found in both Western Australia and South Australia. In Western Australia its white-cream to pink flowers may be seen from June to January, and in South Australia, from May to October.

Description
From the key given in Hunter and Bruhl (1997), the following partial description (differentiating it from other Western Australian Phyllanthus species) is derived: The leaves are normal but sometimes reduced. The plant is monoecious. The branchlets are smooth. The sepals of the female flower enlarge to enclose the fruit, which is from 3 to 5.2 mm by 5 to 6 mm, and encases seed which is from 2.5-3.9 mm by 1-8-2.5 mm.

Taxonomy and naming
It was first described in 1806 by Labillardière. The specific epithet, calycinus, is Latin meaning "with a well developed calyx".

References

calycinus
Flora of Western Australia
Flora of South Australia
Plants described in 1806
Taxa named by Jacques Labillardière